The 1906 Campeonato Carioca, the first edition of that championship, kicked off on May 3, 1906 and ended on October 28, 1906. It was organized by LMF (Liga Metropolitana de Football, or Metropolitan Football League). Six teams participated. Fluminense won the title for the 1st time. No teams were relegated.

Participating teams

System 
The tournament would be disputed in a double round-robin format, with the team with the most points winning the title. The last-placed team would dispute a playoff against the champion of the second level.

Championship

Relegation Playoffs

References 

Campeonato Carioca seasons
Carioca